The following radio stations broadcast on FM frequency 90.3 MHz:

Argentina
 90.3 Tolhuin in Tolhuin, Tierra del Fuego
 903 Radio in Rosario de Lerma, Salta
 Cielo in San Rafael, Mendoza
 Delta in Buenos Aires
 Estilo in Villa Mercedes, San Luis
 FM Victoria in Victoria, Entre Ríos
 Familia in Monte Chingolo, Buenos Aires
 Granadero in General Rodríguez, Buenos Aires
 Identidad Nacional in Tucumán
 La Voz de Cuyo in San Luis
 LRF942 de los cerros in Lago Puelo, Chubut
 MEGA in Bell Ville, Córdoba
 Net Classic in San Lorenzo, Santa Fe
 Oíd Rock in Rio Colorado, Río Negro
 Oliva in Rosario, Santa Fe
 Popular in General Roca, Rio Negro
 Power in La Rioja
 Radio 3 in Rivera, Buenos Aires
 Radio María in Machagai, Chaco
 Radio María in Justiniano Posse, Córdoba
 Radio María in San Francisco, Córdoba
 Radio María in Añatuya, Santiago del Estero
 Radio María in Ingeniero Jacobacci, Río Negro
 Radio María in San Carlos Centro, Santa Fe
 Radio Victoria in Victoria
 Rey de Reyes in Rosario, Santa Fe
 Soho in San Nicolás de los Arroyos, Buenos Aires

Australia
 2KY in Dubbo, New South Wales
 ABC Goulburn Murray in Goulburn, New South Wales
 2MWM in Sydney, New South Wales
 90.3 ABC Sunshine Coast in Sunshine Coast, Queensland
 Triple J in Bendigo, Victoria
 Vision Radio Network in Sale, Victoria
5SSA in Adelaide, South Australia

Canada (Channel 212)
 CBAF-FM-18 in Lameque, New Brunswick
 CBCR-FM in Kirkland Lake, Ontario
 CBEC-FM in Elliot Lake, Ontario
 CBEG-FM in Sarnia, Ontario
 CBNM-FM in Marystown, Newfoundland and Labrador
 CBO-FM-1 in Belleville, Ontario 
 CBON-FM-26 in Hearst, Ontario
 CBPI-FM in Waterton Park, Alberta
 CBTV-FM in Valemount, British Columbia
 CBU-FM-5 in Prince George, British Columbia
 CBVC-FM in Chibougamau, Quebec
 CHYH-FM in Taloyoak, Nunavut
 CIDV-FM in Drayton Valley, Alberta
 CIQI-FM in Montmagny, Quebec
 CJAT-FM-1 in Castlegar, British Columbia
 CJBC-FM in Toronto, Ontario
 CJLR-FM-4 in Regina, Saskatchewan
 CKMP-FM in Calgary, Alberta
 CKRP-FM-2 in Peace River, Alberta
 CKUT-FM in Montreal, Quebec
 VF2317 in Blue River, British Columbia
 VF2461 in Ymir, British Columbia

China 
 CNR Business Radio in Lanzhou

Hungary
 Tilos Rádió in Budapest

Japan
 RNC Radio in Takamatsu, Kagawa

Lithuania
 Rock FM in Kaunas

Malaysia
 Era in Malacca & North Johor
 TraXX FM in Kuala Lumpur & Labuan

Mexico
 XHBP-FM in Gómez Palacio, Durango
 XHEMIA-FM in Guadalajara, Jalisco
 XHFCS-FM in Culiacán, Sinaloa
 XHGD-FM in Hidalgo del Parral, Chihuahua
 XHITZ-FM in Tijuana, Baja California
 XHJPA-FM in Jojutla, Morelos
 XHML-FM in León, Guanajuato
 XHPAPA-FM in Papantla de Olarte, Veracruz
 XHPVA-FM in Puerto Vallarta, Jalisco
 XHQS-FM in Fresnillo, Zacatecas
 XHTG-FM in Tuxtla Gutiérrez, Chiapas
 XHXW-FM in Nogales, Sonora

New Zealand
 Akaroa Radio in Akaroa, Canterbury
 Coast FM in Reefton, West Coast
 The Hits in Masterton, Wellington
 More FM in Whitianga, Waikato
 More FM in Paraparaumu, Wellington
 More FM in Alexandra, Otago
 Newstalk ZB in Napier and Hastings, Hawkes Bay
 RNZ Concert in Rotorua, Bay of Plenty

Philippines
 DWKT in Dagupan
 DWMY in Naga, Camarines Sur
 DYCP in Bacolod
 DXKI-FM in Cagayan de Oro

United States (Channel 212)
 KABA in Louise, Texas
 KANM in Grants, New Mexico
 KANQ in Chanute, Kansas
 KASD in Rapid City, South Dakota
  in Pacific Grove, California
 KBJS in Jacksonville, Texas
  in Holbrook, Arizona
  in Boise, Idaho
  in Brownwood, Texas
 KBUT in Crested Butte, Colorado
  in Topeka, Kansas
 KCAV in Marshall, Arkansas
  in Moorhead, Minnesota
  in Hilo, Hawaii
 KCKE in Chillicothe, Missouri
  in Sunrise Beach, Missouri
  in Casper, Wyoming
 KCTZ in San Lucas, California
 KDTI in Rochester Hills, Michigan
  in Davis, California
  in Monroe, Louisiana
  in Corpus Christi, Texas
 KEDV in Brackettville, Texas
  in Clovis, New Mexico
  in Seattle, Washington
  in Minneapolis, Minnesota
 KFFP-LP in Portland, Oregon
  in Phoenix, Arizona
  in Fresno, California
 KFXY in Buena Vista, Colorado
 KGCD (FM) in Wray, Colorado
  in Cuba, Missouri
 KGSP in Parkville, Missouri
 KHEV in Fairview, Oklahoma
 KIAO in Delta Junction, Alaska
 KJFT (FM) in Arlee, Montana
 KJSD in Watertown, South Dakota
  in Laytonville, California
  in Ardmore, Oklahoma
  in Van Buren, Arkansas
  in Grand Junction, Colorado
 KLGU in Saint George, Utah
 KLIE-LP in Fountain Valley, California
 KLON in Tillamook, Oregon
  in Poplar Bluff, Missouri
 KLWO in Longview, Washington
 KLXC in Carlsbad, New Mexico
 KMGT in Circle, Montana
 KMKL (FM) in North Branch, Minnesota
  in Bassett, Nebraska
  in Camarillo, California
  in Hamilton, Montana
  in Grand Canyon, Arizona
  in Anchorage, Alaska
 KNLG in New Bloomfield, Missouri
  in Yakima, Washington
 KOSC in San Francisco, California
 KPDR in Wheeler, Texas
 KPKW in Susanville, California
 KPOR in Welches, Oregon
 KQOW in Bellingham, Washington
 KRFP in Moscow, Idaho
  in Lincoln, Nebraska
 KSAI in Salem, Oregon
 KSLC in Mcminnville, Oregon
 KSLP in Fort Pierre, South Dakota
 KSXT in Smiley, Texas
  in La Grande, Oregon
  in Jackson, Wyoming
 KVLA-FM in Coachella, California
  in Lawton, Oklahoma
 KWBP (FM) in Big Pine, California
  in Sioux City, Iowa
  in Clayton, Missouri
  in Orchard Valley, Wyoming
  in Lake Charles, Louisiana
 KYRQ in Natalia, Texas
 KYUK-FM in Bethel, Alaska
 KZBN in Bozeman, Montana
  in Pocatello, Idaho
  in Cordele, Georgia
  in Grantsville, Maryland
  in Albany, New York
 WAMF-LP in New Orleans, Louisiana
 WARC (FM) in Meadville, Pennsylvania
  in Fort Wayne, Indiana
  in Beloit, Wisconsin
 WBHM in Birmingham, Alabama
  in Twin Lake, Michigan
 WBRH in Baton Rouge, Louisiana
  in Harwich, Massachusetts
 WCDN-FM in Ridgebury, Pennsylvania
 WCLV in Cleveland, Ohio
 WCSK in Kingsport, Tennessee
  in Salisbury, Maryland
  in Dothan, Alabama
  in Palm Bay, Florida
  in East Stroudsburg, Pennsylvania
  in Colebrook, New Hampshire
  in Hickory, North Carolina
  in Covington, Indiana
 WHBM in Park Falls, Wisconsin
 WHCJ in Savannah, Georgia
  in New York, New York
 WHLA (FM) in La Crosse, Wisconsin
  in Garden City, New York
  in Norfolk, Virginia
 WIGW in Eustis, Florida
  in Flagler Beach, Florida
  in Lancaster, Pennsylvania
 WJVM in Bellefonte, Pennsylvania
 WJWD in Marshall, Wisconsin
 WJWR in Bloomington, Illinois
 WKCD in Cedarville, Ohio
 WKIH in Vidalia, Georgia
 WKJD in Columbus, Indiana
  in Union Township, New Jersey
  in Kinston, North Carolina
  in Brooklyn, New York
  in Owensboro, Kentucky
 WLHI in Schnecksville, Pennsylvania
  in Haines City, Florida
 WLTM in Harrisburg, Illinois
 WLXZ in Pinehurst, North Carolina
  in Biloxi, Mississippi
  in Oxford, Mississippi
  in Morehead, Kentucky
  in Upper Montclair, New Jersey
 WMSH (FM) in Sparta, Illinois
 WNEQ in Taylortown, New Jersey
 WNJO (FM) in Toms River, New Jersey
  in Cape May Court House, New Jersey
  in Galax, Virginia
  in Toledo, Ohio
  in Nashville, Tennessee
 WQUB in Quincy, Illinois
 WQXW in Ossining, New York
 WRBK in Richburg, South Carolina
  in Kingston, Rhode Island
  in Mahwah, New Jersey
  in Oshkosh, Wisconsin
 WRUN in Remsen, New York
  in Syracuse, New York
 WRXT in Roanoke, Virginia
  in Orangeburg, South Carolina
 WUIT-LP in Durham, North Carolina
 WUSI (FM) in Olney, Illinois
  in Knoxville, Tennessee
  in Martin, Tennessee
  in Anasco, Puerto Rico
 WVIK in Rock Island, Illinois
  in Parkersburg, West Virginia
  in Piscataway, New Jersey
  in Westport, Connecticut
 WWQD in Dekalb, Mississippi
 WWQW in Wartburg, Tennessee
 WWQY in Yadkin, North Carolina
 WXBP in Corinth, Maine
 WXDM in Front Royal, Virginia
 WXXY in Houghton, New York
 WYBP in Fort Lauderdale, Florida
  in Greenville, Florida
  in Newton, Massachusetts

References

Lists of radio stations by frequency